Graglia is a surname. Notable people with the surname include: 

Daniela Graglia (born 1976), Italian sprinter and middle distance runner
Lino Graglia (born 1930), American legal scholar
Michele Graglia (born 1983), model, author, and fitness coach
Sylvain Graglia (born 1989), French-born Tahitian footballer